St Richard Gwyn Catholic High School is a Roman Catholic comprehensive secondary school situated in Vale of Glamorgan, Wales.

It is named after the Welsh martyr St. Richard Gwyn. It is co-educational, and educates boys and girls from 11 to 16 years. Any pupils wishing to study at Sixth Form usually attend St David's Roman Catholic Sixth Form College.

Its feeder schools include St Helen's Primary School, Barry, and St Joseph's Primary School, Penarth.

The school was originally named St Cadoc's until the name was changed in 1987. The address of the school also moved from Coldbrook Road, Dinas Powys to Argae Lane, [Vale of Glamorgan].

As of 2005, enrolment was 548, a school record, and further growth was projected. Demand for places had exceed supply in every year since 2000.

The school consists of around about 21 governors some being from the Archdiocese of Cardiff.

References

External links

Catholic secondary schools in the Archdiocese of Cardiff
Secondary schools in the Vale of Glamorgan